Tussebrekka Slope is a mainly ice-covered slope, about 6 nautical miles (11 km) long, at the southwest side of the head of Lunde Glacier in the Muhlig-Hofmann Mountains, Queen Maud Land. Mapped by Norwegian cartographers from surveys and air photos by the Norwegian Antarctic Expedition (1956–60) and named Tussebrekka (the goblin slope).

Ice slopes of Queen Maud Land
Princess Astrid Coast